Madhav Shinde was a film director predominantly working in Marathi film industry. 
He was born on 3rd of October 1917 in Kolhapur, Maharashtra.He passed Away on 19 August 1988 at the age of 71years in Kolhapur after a brief illness.

He is best known for the films Gruhdevta (1957), Kanyadan (1960) and Manasala Pankh Astat (1961) for which he won the National Film Award for Best Feature Film in Marathi.

Selected filmography 

wadal (1953)
Kanchanga (1954)
Gruhdevta (1957)
Kanyadan (1960)
Manasala Pankh Astat (1961)
Bayakocha Bhau 
Shikaleli Bayako (1967)
Dharma Kanya (1969)
Sansar (1981)

References 

Marathi film directors